Persona 5, a role-playing video game by Atlus, is centered on the Phantom Thieves of Hearts, a vigilante group of high-school students working to change the hearts of criminals by getting them to confess their crimes through defeating a physical manifestation of their subconscious in a mysterious realm known as the Metaverse. Its playable characters can be controlled in the game's many locations, known as "Palaces". People with great desires and a distorted perception of the world have a Palace in the Metaverse which the Phantom Thieves access through a mobile app on their smartphones. Persona 5 is set within Tokyo beginning in April of the year "20XX".

The player character is a silent protagonist codenamed Joker. He is a high school student who moves to Tokyo after being expelled from his former school due to a false accusation of assault, later forming the Phantom Thieves. He forms it with Morgana, a mysterious cat-like creature who serves as the Thieves's second-in-command, guiding them around the Metaverse, wanting to discover his origins and restore his true form, alongside Ryuji Sakamoto, who is seen as a delinquent at his school due to an incident with his former track team. More characters join the group during their heists, including fashion model Ann Takamaki, art prodigy Yusuke Kitagawa, student-council president Makoto Niijima, hacker and foster daughter of your temporary guardian Sojiro Sakura, Futaba Sakura and business heiress Haru Okumura. Also interacting with Joker are Goro Akechi, a high-school student and ace detective; Sae Niijima, a public prosecutor and Makoto's older sister; the residents of the Velvet Room; Igor and his assistants, Caroline and Justine.

Many of the game's characters represent the tarot's Major Arcana suit. Although the suit has twenty-two cards and Royal-exclusive characters account for two additional, alternate Arcana for a total of twenty-four, only twenty-one (twenty-three in Royal) are represented by characters; the last one, The World, is given at a later point in the game. The seven deadly sins are a recurring theme within the game, with certain characters and situations representing certain ones.

Creation and design
The game's character design and setting distinguish it from previous entries in the series, replacing Persona 4 yellow-and-green palette with reds and blacks. As with Persona 3 and Persona 4, its characters were designed by Shigenori Soejima. In an interview, Soejima said that he could not design the characters without the game's theme and plot being set, so he was given very detailed instructions from the producer during the process. He also worked on the color scheme and its overall visual presentation. In addition to their casual and school apparel, each of the Phantom Thief characters have their own thematic costumes with masks when they enter the Metaverse, as well as codenames.

Phantom Thieves of Hearts

Joker

The protagonist, who goes by the Phantom Thief codename "Joker", is the game's main playable character. In the game, he is a second-year high school student who gets expelled due to a false accusation of assault from a corrupt politician. As a result, he leaves his hometown and moves in with a family friend in Tokyo to serve a one-year probation. Following his transfer to a new school, he and a group of other students awaken to a supernatural power known as the Persona. Soon after, they form a vigilante group known as the Phantom Thieves of Hearts, whose purpose is to explore the Metaverse, a metaphysical realm consisting of the physical manifestation of humanity's subconscious desires, to remove malevolent intent from people's hearts.

He holds the "Wild Card", an ability that allows him to hold more than one Persona and fuse together Personas to create new ones. His original Persona is Arsène (based on Arsène Lupin) of the Fool Arcana and he fights with knives and handguns. His ultimate Persona is Satanael, the Gnostic equivalent of the devil, a deity who can harness the power of the seven deadly sins. Joker also appears in series spin-off games Persona 5: Dancing in Starlight, Persona 5 Strikers and Persona Q2: New Cinema Labyrinth, as a playable character in the crossover fighting game Super Smash Bros. Ultimate and in various other cross-promotions outside of the series. He is portrayed by Hiroki Ino in Persona 5: The Stage. While the player can freely name Joker in the game, he is canonically named  in most appearances and Akira Kurusu in the manga adaptation.

Morgana

, using the Phantom Thief code name "Mona", is an amnesiac, mysterious cat-like creature that encounters the protagonist after they free him from his cell in Kamoshida's Palace. Wanting to discover his origins and restore his true form, he joins the protagonist in his heists, teaches him and his allies the mechanics of the Metaverse, and the ropes of being a phantom thief. Hashino describes Morgana as similar to Persona 4 Teddie and a mentor of the Phantom Thieves. Outside the Metaverse, Morgana has the appearance of a domestic cat and lives with Joker.

His persona is Zorro, which Hashino describes as Morgana's ideal human form. Morgana fights with a slingshot and curved sword. He can transform into a minivan in the Metaverse, which allows the Phantom Thieves to travel quickly. Morgana represents the Magician Arcana as a Confidant, allowing Joker to craft a variety of tools to help the Phantom Thieves explore the Metaverse. As the Confidant progresses automatically, Morgana's Persona will transform into Mercurius. In Persona 5 Royal, his Persona can evolve into Diego. He seeks Joker's help to discover his true form, and believes that he was once human. After the Phantom Thieves enter further into Mementos, Morgana learns that he was created by Igor to help guide Joker against Yaldabaoth. After Yaldabaoth is defeated, Morgana loses his Metaverse form and vows to remain with Joker in hope of becoming human. In Royal, Morgana gains a human body when the Phantom Thieves were living in Maruki's reality, voiced by Bryce Papenbrook. In Super Smash Bros. Ultimate, Morgana is featured in Joker's taunts, victory poses and All-Out Attack Final Smash, in addition to being a spirit and a background character on the Mementos stage as the Morganamobile. Morgana also appears as a downloadable player character in Super Monkey Ball Banana Mania.

Ryuji Sakamoto

, using the Phantom Thief codename "Skull", is Joker's first companion. Hashino describes Ryuji as "defiant", but a "nice guy". Offended by the slightest comments from others, he can sometimes resort to violence. He lives with his mother, the two of them having been abandoned by his abusive, alcoholic father.

Ryuji was formerly the star runner on Shujin Academy's track and field team. When Kamoshida started spreading rumours to the rest of the team about Ryuji's troubled family life, Ryuji threw a punch at him in a fit of rage. In retaliation, Kamoshida broke Ryuji's leg in 'self-defense', and he was forced to quit the track team. Because Ryuji struck Kamoshida, the track team was suspended; blamed for the incident, he earned a reputation as a delinquent at the school.<ref name="DefenseRyuji">{{cite web |url=https://kotaku.com/in-defence-of-persona-5-s-ryuji-1797700262 | title=In Defense of Persona 5s Ryuji | publisher=Kotaku | access-date=November 17, 2017 | url-status=live | archive-url=https://web.archive.org/web/20171025072843/https://kotaku.com/in-defence-of-persona-5-s-ryuji-1797700262 | archive-date=October 25, 2017 | df=mdy-all }}</ref>

Ryuji's persona is Captain Kidd. In battle, he fights with clubs and shotguns. As a confidant, Ryuji represents the Chariot Arcana and allows the Phantom Thieves to instantly defeat lower-level Shadows. Joker helps Ryuji rediscover his love for running and re-establish the track team. Despite reuniting the team, Ryuji plans to run on his own instead. Upon completing his Confidant, Ryuji's Persona takes the form of Seiten Taisei, who is known for his immense strength. In Persona 5 Royal, his Persona can evolve into William.
He is portrayed by Kouhei Shiota in Persona 5: The Stage. In Super Smash Bros. Ultimate, Ryuji is a spirit and a background character on the Mementos stage.

Ann Takamaki

, using the Phantom Thief codename "Panther", is a one-quarter-American girl in Joker's class who recently returned to Japan. She speaks English fluently, and is a model. Despite her popularity and unique appearance, Ann is shunned by the girls in her class because of her rumored relationship with the gym teacher Kamoshida. Hashino describes Ann as "the life of the party", who "will have an impact on the fate of the main characters."

When Ann discovers that her best friend Shiho Suzui's suicide attempt is linked to Kamoshida, she joins the Phantom Thieves. Her Persona is Carmen, whom Hashino describes as a "femme fatale character." Ann fights with whips and submachine guns. She represents the Lovers Arcana as a Confidant, and helps Joker negotiate with the Shadows. As Joker befriends her, Ann improves herself for Shiho and begins taking her modeling career seriously. When she completes her Confidant, Ann's Persona evolves into Hecate. In Persona 5 Royal, her Persona can evolve into Célestine.

In Super Smash Bros. Ultimate, Ann is a spirit and a background character on the Mementos stage.

Yusuke Kitagawa

, using the Phantom Thief codename "Fox", is a student in the fine-arts department of Kosei High School. A composed, elegant, observant young man, he has a passion for art and is concerned with the aesthetics of his environment. Yusuke has been sheltered throughout his life, and is eccentric around other people. Because he is poor, he often skips meals to save money for art supplies, eating ravenously when he gets a chance to.

Yusuke's mother died when he was three, leaving him an orphan. He was taken in by his mentor, the painter Ichiryusai Madarame. Yusuke sees him as a father figure and idolizes him for creating his favorite painting, Sayuri. However, he is eventually forced to accept that Madarame is an exploitative, emotionally abusive mentor who plagiarizes his students for profit, robbing them of their passion for art, which leads to him awakening his Persona and joining the Phantom Thieves. Eventually, he learns that Sayuri was a self-portrait by his mother holding him as an infant, and that Madarame allowed her to die from an easily treatable seizure to steal the credit for it and painted over Yusuke to decontextualize her expression, manufacturing mystery for the sake of artistic appeal; this revelation enrages Yusuke and leads to him fully rejecting Madarame as a mentor.

Yusuke's Persona is Goemon. He fights with Japanese swords and assault rifles. As a Confidant, Yusuke represents the Emperor Arcana and assists the Phantom Thieves by copying skill cards. After Madarame's change of heart, Yusuke has difficulty regaining his ability to create art. The protagonist helps Yusuke to regain his ability to paint, rediscover his love for art, and see the beauty of the world around him; this inspires him to paint Desire and Hope. When he completes his Confidant, Yusuke's Persona evolves into Kamu Susano-o. In Persona 5 Royal, his Persona can evolve into Gorokichi.

In Super Smash Bros. Ultimate, Yusuke is a spirit and a background character on the Mementos stage.

Makoto Niijima

, using the Phantom Thief codename "Queen", is the student-council president at Shujin Academy. Makoto, the school's top student, is considered the brains of the Phantom Thieves. Analytical, she can deduce conclusions, theorize in several situations, and make elaborate plans to succeed. Behind this exterior, she has an inferiority complex and often praises her sister Sae Niijima. Makoto feels that she is a burden to Sae because of their father's death, which is her motivation to work hard, be successful, and reduce her sister's stress. Makoto starts tailing the Phantom Thieves to find information for Principal Kobayakawa. Learning their identities, she tasks the team with changing the heart of mafia boss Junya Kaneshiro, before resolving to join the team and fight alongside them when she herself is getting tired of being told what to do by everyone, proving that she's being useful after all. Makoto's persona is Johanna, and she fights with revolvers and tekko.

As a Confidant, Makoto represents the Priestess Arcana and provides the Phantom Thieves with a more-detailed analysis of in-game enemies. As Joker gets closer to her, Makoto decides to become better-acquainted with her classmates and befriends Eiko Takao. She discovers that Eiko is in a relationship with Tsukasa, a shifty-looking man who has manipulated girls into working for illegal businesses in Shinjuku. Makoto reveals Tsukasa's true nature to Eiko with Joker's help, and decides to follow her father onto the police force. When she completes her Confidant, Makoto's Persona evolves into Anat. In Persona 5 Royal, her Persona can evolve into Agnes.

In Super Smash Bros. Ultimate, Makoto is a spirit and a background character on the Mementos stage.

Futaba Sakura

, using the Phantom Thief code name "Oracle" ("Navi" in the Japanese version), is the adopted daughter of Sojiro Sakura (the owner of the café where Joker lives). Although Futaba is a genius computer hacker, she is a recluse at the beginning of the game due to multiple traumatic experiences exacerbating social anxiety; even after she joins the Phantom Thieves, she is fearful of large crowds. Two years before the game begins, she sees her mother (Wakaba Isshiki) killed by a car and is framed for her death with a forged suicide note, resulting in her extended family shunning her as a murderer and verbally abusing her. After this, she is bounced among abusive family members until Sojiro intervenes and takes her in. This severe trauma proves to have a catastrophic effect on her mental health; she suffers auditory hallucinations of her extended family's reactions to the suicide note and visual hallucinations of her mother staring at her disapprovingly, resulting in her internalizing her family's hatred of her and locking herself in her bedroom.

Futaba appears withdrawn by the time of the game's events, and has developed a Palace depicting her sloth in the form of a pyramid; however, the Palace's true sin is wrath, taking the form of the sole cognitive inhabitant, a vicious sphinx representing Futaba's warped and incorrect belief that her mother hated her. She has become so depressed and self-loathing that her Shadow represents her repressed positive emotions and helps the Phantom Thieves traverse her Palace, fighting for control of the Palace with the sphinx, which takes over whenever she is hallucinating. As the Phantom Thieves slowly become more popular, Futaba blackmails them into changing her heart with the alias "Alibaba" after a supposed malevolent hacking group using her old alias "Medjed" targets them; though she abandons the deal after realizing it entails meeting them in person, they approach her  when Medjed continues to threaten them and commit to the heist upon learning her plight. Just before she receives the calling card, Futaba finds the Metaverse Navigator on her phone, and her Shadow appears before her and beckons her to enter her Palace. During the final heist, Futaba hallucinates while entering her Palace's keywords into the Nav, resulting in the sphinx manifesting and attacking the Phantom Thieves. After entering her Palace and discovering the truth about her mother's death, Futaba awakens her Persona (Necronomicon) and helps the Phantom Thieves defeat the sphinx, which they have found impossible to fight due to the severe terrain disadvantage caused by her flying. After the fight, the Phantom Thieves discover that rather than having a Treasure, she was the Treasure, and that her Palace is collapsing unusually quickly because she awakened a Persona. Much like the cast of Persona 4, the strain of awakening a Persona debilitates Futaba for potentially several weeks depending on how long before the deadline the player completed the Palace, and she spends much of the interim asleep. Her unique Change of Heart, a result of her taming her Shadow, prevents her from ending up in the Prison of Regression.

After preventing Medjed from throwing Japan into chaos and a week of the Thieves coaxing her out of her shell, she officially joins the Phantom Thieves, replacing Morgana as the party's navigator. She later discovers that the Medjed who targeted the Phantom Thieves is little more than a script kiddie loyal to a political conspiracy headed by Masayoshi Shido aiming to use the Metaverse to turn Japan into a dictatorship, and that this same conspiracy had her mother murdered to steal her cognitive psience research. She plays an instrumental role in the conspiracy's downfall through changing Shido's heart; she confronts the Shadow of an IT company president who turns out to have been the false Medjed, and she hacks into several television networks to broadcast Shido's calling card.

As a Confidant, Futaba represents the Hermit Arcana and provides detailed locations and extra assistance in battle. After learning to adjust to a normal life, she makes a "promise list" of goals she wants to reach with the help of Joker. As Futaba slowly recovers, she reveals that in her youth she was bullied for her intelligence and had only one friend named Kana. Futaba discovers that Kana's parents were abusing her. She tracks down Kana, and learns that the abuse has continued. After changing her parents' hearts, Kana and Futaba rebuild their friendship. When she completes her Confidant, Futaba's Persona evolves into Prometheus. In Persona 5 Royal, her Persona can evolve into Al Azif.

She is portrayed by  beginning in Persona 5: The Stage #3. In Super Smash Bros. Ultimate, Futaba is featured in Joker's Final Smash, All-Out Attack, in addition to being a spirit.

Haru Okumura

, using the Phantom Thief codename "Noir", is the heiress of Okumura Foods (owner of the Big Bang Burger restaurant chain). Haru first appears at the fireworks festival in July and, later, as a third-year chaperone on the school trip. When the Phantom Thieves first encounter her in the Metaverse, she is using the alias  and is allied with Morgana (who has temporarily left the Phantom Thieves). She becomes a Phantom Thief to escape a marriage arranged by her father, Kunikazu Okumura, realizing that her father sees her as a tool to advance his business and political ambitions. However, after they change his heart, his Shadow is destroyed by Black Mask, resulting in a fatal mental shutdown, and the Phantom Thieves eventually discover that Shido-loyalists manipulated them into targeting him in an attempt to engineer their downfall.

Haru's Persona is Milady, and she fights with grenade launchers and axes. As a Confidant, she represents the Empress Arcana and uses her gardening skills to grow SP healing items. After her father's death, Haru becomes Okumura Foods' largest shareholder. Many in her business, including her fiancé Sugimura, are trying to wrest control from her. Company officials want to expand into coffee shops with cheap labor, but Haru wants a friendly, intimate atmosphere like her grandfather's shop. In conversations with Joker, she learns to stand up for herself; the company adopts her idea, and she breaks her engagement with Sugimura. When she completes her Confidant, Haru's Persona evolves into Astarte. In Persona 5 Royal, her Persona can evolve into Lucy.

She is portrayed by  beginning in Persona 5: The Stage #3. In Super Smash Bros. Ultimate, Haru is a spirit and a background character on the Mementos stage.

Goro Akechi

 is a popular teenaged detective who has been given the title of "The Second Coming of the Detective Prince" by the media. His talents have been widely praised, and he openly opposes the Phantom Thieves. As a Confidant, he represents the Justice Arcana. During his Confidant, Akechi befriends Joker and admits his concerns about the Phantom Thieves' case and his past. He later joins the Thieves (with the codename "Crow") after learning their identities, and forces them to change Sae Nijima's heart to clear their names.

Akechi works for Masayoshi Shido as the "Black Mask" exploiting the Metaverse. He uses his Persona to assist Shido's campaign, but secretly plans to destroy his career by revealing himself as his illegitimate son when he becomes prime minister and avenging his mother's suicide. Akechi was forced to live in a series of abusive foster homes, and he is deeply contemptuous of society as a result. Because the Phantom Thieves are actively working against Shido, Akechi betrays them and also attempts to assassinate Joker, partly out of jealousy. After the Phantom Thieves defeat him in Shido's Palace, he sacrifices himself to save them when they are attacked by his cognitive self-created by Shido.  In Persona 5 Royal, Akechi becomes playable during the third semester. Near the end of the game, Maruki reveals to Joker that Akechi was brought back to reality out of Joker's wish to save him, and his survival depends on the choices the player made throughout the game.

Like Joker, Akechi is a wild card and can use several Personas simultaneously. However, his wild card ability is stagnant due to his lack of genuine human relations, meaning he only has two Personas - one representing his façade as a detective, and one representing his true colors. The Persona he uses as a member of the Phantom Thieves is Robin Hood; when he faces the party in his boss battle, he switches to Loki in the second half of the fight. In Persona 5 Royal, his Ultimate Persona is Hereward. With the Phantom Thieves, Akechi fights with laser sabers and ray guns; when he fights them after revealing his true colors, he uses a serrated sword and a silenced pistol.

He is portrayed by Yoshihide Sasaki in Persona 5: The Stage. In Super Smash Bros. Ultimate, Akechi appears as a spirit and Joker has a color scheme based on Akechi's Crow outfit.

Kasumi Yoshizawa

, who assumes the codename "Violet", is a character introduced in Persona 5 Royal. She is a first-year student that transfers to Shujin Academy around the same time as Joker. She is a rhythmic gymnast and due to her abilities the school has high hopes for her. Although she has a good relationship with Joker and his friends, her opinion towards the Phantom Thieves is quite negative, saying that their actions may lead people to heavily rely on the Phantom Thieves instead of making their own efforts to solve their problems. Despite this, she later joins them when a new Palace emerges. Eventually, she is revealed to be Kasumi's younger twin sister, whose memories were changed by Takuto Maruki to make her believe that she is Kasumi, after the real Kasumi died pushing her out of the way of traffic.

Sumire's Persona is Cendrillon. In battle, she fights with rapiers, lever shotguns and rifles. As a Confidant, she represents the Faith Arcana. In the beginning of her Confidant, she faces a slump in gymnastics, but once she remembers she is Sumire, she learns how to accept herself. Once her Confidant is maxed, her Persona transforms into Vanadies, and it can also transform into Ella.

Sophia

, who assumes the codename "Sophie", is a character introduced in Persona 5 Strikers. She was first found in a box in an underground section of the Shibuya Jail by Joker after he first entered the Shibuya Jail via EMMA, a virtual assistant app, by accident. She then introduced herself as an Artificial Intelligence with her memories lost except her own name and her reason for existence, "To be humanity's companion". In the real world, she assists the Phantom Thieves as a virtual assistant such as navigation in their tour. Throughout the Phantom Thieves' adventure, she learns more about humans' emotions and began forming a bond with Joker and the rest of the Phantom Thieves. She was later revealed to be EMMA's prototype and was given her first command to be a good friend of all humans by her creator, Kuon Ichinose. However, she was deemed as a failure. Ichinose then forced a command on her to betray the Phantom Thieves. She resisted the commands after recalling her memories with the Phantom Thieves and managed to defy her creator's command and awaken her own Persona to fight back. After she and the Phantom Thieves defeat Demiurge and EMMA ceases from existence, Sophia decides to accompany Ichinose on her journey, parting ways with the Phantom Thieves.

Sophia originally fought with a Persona-like entity called Pithos that later in the game evolves into a full Persona called Pandora which represents the Hope Arcana. In battle, Sophia fights with Yo-yos and blasters. Outside of Jails, she resides in Joker's smartphone as she does not have a physical body.

Zenkichi Hasegawa

, who assumes the codename "Wolf", is a character introduced in Persona 5 Strikers. He is a police officer from the Public Security Bureau and he struck a deal with the Phantom Thieves so as to find out the mastermind behind the brainwashing events around Japan. He has a daughter, Akane, but she hated him ever since her mother, Aoi Hasegawa, passed away in a hit-and-run accident and he couldn't arrest the person responsible for his late wife's death. At first, he was content with just solving the case and would even go so far as to abandon the Phantom Thieves. However, after bonding with them during the cases, and them helping him reconcile with his daughter changed his personality somewhat towards the Phantom Thieves. He also allowed the Phantom Thieves to escape arrest when they were framed for murder in Okinawa and the hacking of the virtual assistant, EMMA, which led to him being temporarily arrested. The Phantom Thieves, through Sae Niijima, allowed him to be released from arrest and subsequently awaken his Persona when his daughter was manipulated to be a monarch for Kyoto's Jail.

Zenkichi's Persona is Valjean, based on the main character from Victor Hugo's novel Les Misérables, and represents the Apostle Arcana. In battle, Zenkichi fights with a greatsword and wields a dual set of revolvers.

Antagonists
In Persona 5, some individuals have a severely-distorted view of the world and the people around them. At a certain level characters gain a Palace, a place in the Metaverse where their desires appear. Eight palaces must be overcome, represented by the seven deadly sins; each palace has an owner with whom the main characters interact. In Persona 5 Strikers, a character's corrupted Shadow Self is represented as a "Monarch" that rules over a "Jail" in the Metaverse as opposed to a Palace, with their distorted desires instead manifesting from resentment towards certain people or traumas they had previously endured, who use the mobile application EMMA to artificially inflate their own ego by stealing the desires of civilians. As opposed to the Palace owners, Monarchs' Treasures are related to core traumatic memories that are viewed by the main characters as catalysts for their corruption.

Suguru Kamoshida

 is Shujin Academy's PE teacher and volleyball coach, a former professional athlete and Olympic volleyball champion. Kamoshida abuses and sexually assaults the students, which is ignored by the principal because of the volleyball team's fame and his status as an olympian, and, prior to the game's events, provoked Ryuji into assaulting him in order to destroy the track team. Kamoshida targets Ann as his latest sexual conquest; when she rejects his advances, he forces himself on her best friend, Shiho Suzui, resulting in a traumatized and suicidal Shiho jumping off the school roof. When Kamoshida is confronted by Joker, Ryuji, and Mishima, he threatens to have the three of them expelled at the next school-board meeting. This incident convinces an enraged Joker and Ryuji, who were previously hesitant to resort to the Metaverse due to the possibility of unintentionally killing him, to change his heart and leads to Ann entering his Palace and awakening to a Persona.

Kamoshida's palace represents lust and takes the form of a castle, where he sees himself as the king due to his power at Shujin Academy. The male members of the volleyball team are depicted as being subjected to torturous training, and the female team members (as well as Ann) are viewed as his sex slaves. After his Shadow is defeated, his Treasure (an ornate crown) manifests as his Olympic medal in reality. After his change of heart, Kamoshida surrenders to the police and confesses his crimes. Unlike most of the game's palace-possessing antagonists, Kamoshida is not part of its overall conspiracy. He is portrayed by Shun Takagi in Persona 5: The Stage.

Ichiryusai Madarame

 is a well-known artist who secretly plagiarizes and profits from his students' work. Yusuke's mentor, he lets him live in his run-down shack as his pupil. Yusuke admires him at first as the creator of his favorite painting, Sayuri, but later discovers that Madarame stole it from his mother and let her die from a seizure. Madarame then pretended that the painting was stolen from him to fraudulently sell copies of the original to private collectors. When Ann and Yusuke discover Madarame's plagiarism, he threatens to have them arrested for trespassing after his art exhibit is over (including Joker and Ryuji).

Madarame's palace represents vanity, and takes the form of a lavish art museum where his students are depicted as portraits on display from which he can profit from. His Treasure is the original Sayuri painting, which depicts Yusuke's mother with her infant son in her arms; Madarame had painted over Yusuke to add mystery and appeal to the piece and make his claim as the painter more believable. The Sayuri is the least distorted Treasure seen on-screen; within the Metaverse, the only addition is an ornate frame, and the painting itself is unchanged. After his change of heart, he calls a press conference to admit his crimes and plagiarism. Yusuke later gives the original Sayuri to Sojiro Sakura to hang in Cafe LeBlanc.

Junya Kaneshiro

 is a ruthless mafia boss who is responsible for enlisting students from Shujin Academy to smuggle drugs in Shibuya. Makoto, tasked by the principal to investigate, allows herself to be taken by the yakuza. When the Phantom Thieves try to rescue her, Kaneshiro blackmails them into paying him  in three weeks with a threat to show photographs of them at a night club to their schools.

Kaneshiro's palace represents gluttony and takes the form of a bank hovering above Shibuya, where people are viewed as walking automated teller machines from which he can drain money. His treasure appears as large gold bars in his palace, manifesting in reality as a golden briefcase filled with fake money. After his change of heart, Kaneshiro deletes the photographs, voids the Phantom Thieves' debt, and surrenders to the police. He is portrayed by Yuya Miyashita in Persona 5: The Stage #2.

Kunikazu Okumura

 is the third president of Okumura Foods and Haru Okumura's father. Growing up in a financially struggling family, with his father in constant debt, Okumura transformed his family's small company into a multi-million-yen business and founded the popular Big Bang Burger fast-food chain. Because of his mistreatment of his employees, he quickly becomes the most popular suggested target on the Phantom Thieves' online poll, and his abhorrent treatment of Haru causes the Thieves to commit to targeting him.

Okumura was part of Masayoshi Shido's circle as a sponsor until he decided to enter politics himself. One of his first steps in achieving this ambition is arranging a marriage between Haru and the abusive and domineering Sugimura, who is from a politically influential family. When Shido discovers this, he begins to see Okumura as a threat and orders him killed before the election. Using the Phantom Thieves as scapegoats, the conspiracy rigs the online poll in order to frame them for Okumura's murder; his Shadow is killed by Goro Akechi after the Phantom Thieves defeat him, resulting in him suffering a mental shutdown during a live conference before he can reveal the names of those linked to Shido.

Okumura's palace represents greed, and is depicted as a space station where his employees are robots that work in poor conditions and are incinerated when they break down, becoming nothing more than fuel for the spaceship being built to launch him into the political world. His treasure is the core for his spaceship in his palace, and manifests in reality as a spaceship model kit he had dreamed of owning as a child but could not afford due to his family's financial woes.

He is portrayed by Hiroya Matsumoto in Persona 5: The Stage.

Masayoshi Shido

 is a politician and a representative in Japan's National Diet. Early in the game, a drunken Shido frames Joker for physical assault after he tries to prevent Shido from sexually assaulting his subordinate, resulting in Joker being placed on probation. He later appears as a candidate for prime minister, leading the United Future Party. To secure victory, he and his followers (including his illegitimate son, Akechi) steal Wakaba's research on "cognitive psience," and use the Metaverse to cause mental shutdowns and psychotic breakdowns to eliminate potential threats and spread distrust for the current government administration. When the Phantom Thieves gain traction, he and his followers frame them for their crimes in order to bolster his own popularity among the general public. Under the influence of Yaldabaoth, the public becomes convinced not merely that he is the only viable candidate, but is a savior sent to usher in a golden age for Japan, though anyone aware of Shido's true colors realizes that this "golden age" would be a corrupt and indulgent administration that would run the country into the ground and feed on the suffering of the populace; Shido does not care whether or not Japan flourishes or declines, so long as he maintains a position of power and dominance over those he views as beneath him.

Shido's palace represents pride and takes the form of a cruise ship sailing though a sunken Tokyo, where he and his conspirators live in luxury; rather than cognitive beings, the Shadow selves of Shido's conspirators also reside within the palace, having been drawn to his strong personality and ego. His treasure is a golden ship's wheel in his palace, manifesting as his legislator's pin in reality. After Shido's change of heart, he confesses his crimes in a press conference after his landslide victory; however, the cult of personality he benefited from is maintained by Yaldabaoth until the Phantom Thieves destroy Mementos. He is arrested at the end of the game, and Joker testifies against him at his trial.

Yaldabaoth
Yaldabaoth, the God of Control, is a malevolent being that appears in the form of the Holy Grail: a Treasure of Mementos created from humanity's distorted sloth. He leads the conspiracy to give Masayoshi Shido political power and sponsored the Phantom Thieves to see which is stronger: their salvation of the world or Goro Akechi's desire to destroy (and recreate) it. Yaldabaoth imprisons Igor, impersonating him until Joker unmasks his identity.

He reveals himself as power-hungry, self-righteous and sadistic, with a tendency to toy with humanity. When Akechi and Shido are defeated, Yaldabaoth decides that the world should be saved; this "salvation" entails taking control of existence and removing everyone with chaos in their heart. He awakens his body in the core of Mementos, merging them with the physical world as his palace. This gives Yaldabaoth the ability to change lies into truth, driving people into despair and complacency and erasing his enemies.

He is described as the manifestation of humanity's desire for order and control, warped to the point where he no longer cares for the human cost (or morality) of that order. Yaldabaoth sees humans as little more than livestock and lemmings for him to rule, due to their self-destructiveness and stupidity, though he does admit the existence of competent and talented humans which he considers to be useful for him. He initially takes the form of the Holy Grail, which is black before the flow of wishes for him to dominate the world revitalizes him and turns the chalice gold. After the flow is cut off and the Grail is defeated, the chalice merges with his arena to become a giant, robotic, faceless angel who can manifest a gun, bell, sword, and book with each of his four arms. At the end of his fight it is revealed that he had enough power to defeat the Phantom Thieves at will, but kept fighting them out of arrogance. After this fight, one of the Phantom Thieves' allies (Yūki Mishima) along with the rest of Joker's confidants manages to convince the surviving civilians to support their fight against the evil god, leading to the creation of the protagonist's ultimate Persona, Satanael. With Joker using the power of Satanael, Yaldabaoth is finally defeated and reverts to his original, mindless form of the Holy Grail, bringing an end to his ambitions and destroying Mementos for good. In Royal, however, his defeat simply allows Takuto Maruki to take his place as the ruler of the Metaverse and enact his plan to rewrite reality to create a utopia.

 Alice Hiiragi 

Introduced in Persona 5 Strikers, Alice Hiiragi is perceived by the public as a cute, charismatic pop idol that has left the entire city of Shibuya smitten with her fashion sense. In reality, she manipulated her public self-image using the transformative effects of the mobile application known as EMMA, which is functionally similar to the Metaverse Navigator, and has used her position of power to sadistically abuse and bully unknowing men in stable relationships by forcing changes of hearts onto them in a similar fashion to the Phantom Thieves of Hearts. Her Shadow Self bears the appearance of a dominatrix queen, and portrays herself as a lustful, unforgiving temptress in stark contrast to her innocent image in the real world.

Through infiltrating her Trauma Cell, it is revealed to the Phantom Thieves that Alice was a former student at Shujin Academy who developed depression and low self-esteem as a result of continued bullying by popular girls around her, following a failed confession attempt by a boy she knew. She was highly introverted prior to pursuing fashion, and used the EMMA app out of revenge against other former Shujin students attempting to destroy her career and popularity by spreading insults and rumors about her past school life, enabling acts such as causing said bullies to develop addictions to her and changing the hearts of bystanding men in Shibuya so that they become her submissive lovers instead. Her paranoia surrounding her past life is accentuated when she meets Ann Takamaki in the Metaverse for the first time, whom she views as no different from other popular, sociable girls she knew due to Ann's nature as a highly attractive model. When she is defeated by the Phantom Thieves, her Shadow acknowledges that she didn't do anything to improve her self-image on her own, and was wrong to follow the examples of those who tormented her.

Ango Natsume

Ango Natsume is an author in Sendai best known for his novel Prince of Nightmares, which has sold over 1 million copies and won a literary award. In reality, the book heavily plagiarises various other works, it's popularity only extends to Sendai, and Natsume is using the EMMA app to steal the desires of the populace; the result is fans of Natsume buying several copies of Prince of Nightmares with loaned money, defacing the Date Masamune statue with promotional posters, and attacking any who criticize Natsume or accuse him of plagiarism. His Shadow Self takes the form of the main protagonist of his book standing behind a cardboard cutout to appear imposing; in reality, he wears nothing but a pair of red underwear.

When the Phantom Thieves infiltrate his trauma cell, they discover that Natsume overheard his publishers insult him and discuss jury-rigging the literary award so that his book would win, allowing them to sell his book on the reputation of his grandfather, an award-winning novelist; Natsume then used the EMMA app to place his publishers under his control as revenge for their plans to manipulate him. After being defeated by the Phantom Thieves, his Shadow Self admits that he was wrong to plagiarise other works and manipulate the herats of other. In the Real World, Natsume admits to his plagiarsim and promises full refunds to those who bought his book, with the plot by his publishers to manipulate him alos being revelaed to the public. Yusuke Kitagawa encourages him to continue pursuing his dream without relying on the works of others for success, and Natsume vows to write his next novel using his own ideas.

Confidants
Like previous Persona games, progression of the characters' skills is based on their level of bonding with non-player characters. Persona 5 has , replacing Persona 3 and Persona 4 "Social Links". Each Confidant represents a tarot Arcana (suit), based on their disposition and problems. Spending time with a Confidant allows characters to advance personas of the same Arcana, gain extra skills, and fuse the strongest persona of that Arcana.

Sae Niijima

 is a prosecutor for the Tokyo District Special Investigation Department and legal guardian of her sister, Makoto. Although Sae cares for Makoto and helps her succeed, she sees her sister as a burden who takes what little enjoyment is left in life after their father, a police officer, was killed in the line of duty. In her disillusionment with the Japanese judicial system, Sae develops a Palace representing envy in the form of a rigged casino where she always wins. She is assigned to the Phantom Thieves case, and becomes fixated on them. Due to the heist taking place in the midst of a ruse intended to counter another ruse, her Treasure is not stolen; her heart is instead changed through a combination of Makoto reasoning with her Shadow and her interrogation of Joker in the aftermath of the "failed" heist, preventing her from ending up in the Prison of Regression. Since a briefcase was used as a decoy Treasure to leave Akechi unaware that the Phantom Thieves had discovered his true colors, it is unknown what form the Treasure took within the Metaverse; however, Makoto suspects that it would have manifested in reality as their father's police notebook, and the unformed Treasure has a silhouette of a notebook within.

As a Confidant, Sae represents the Judgment Arcana. During the game, she interrogates Joker about the Phantom Thieves following his arrest. Although Sae is tasked to prosecute the Phantom Thieves, she believes Joker's story and helps him escape. As the interrogation is a frame story and the rank 10 requirements progress the story beyond November 20, this Confidant is technically completed in a single day - one where Joker has no access to the Velvet Room - and therefore has no effect on gameplay, not even Arcana Burst, until it is maxed out. When she completes her Confidant she decides to help out the Phantom Thieves, and ultimately quits being a prosecutor to become a defense attorney.

Sojiro Sakura

 is the owner of Café Leblanc and Joker's guardian during his probation. Originally cold toward Joker at the beginning of the game, Sojiro eventually warms up to him over time. He teaches Joker about coffee and curry when he works at the café.<ref name="CoffeeSojiro">{{cite web |url=https://kotaku.com/persona-5s-coffee-fixation-is-very-cute-1794018219 | title=Persona 5'''s Coffee Fixation is very cute | publisher=Kotaku | access-date=November 17, 2017 | url-status=live | archive-url=https://web.archive.org/web/20171025072926/https://kotaku.com/persona-5s-coffee-fixation-is-very-cute-1794018219 | archive-date=October 25, 2017 | df=mdy-all }}</ref> The protagonist later learns that Sojiro is Futaba's legal guardian, and adopted her after her mother's death.

Sojiro, a former government official, was in love with Wakaba, Futaba's mother. He left the government sector to work at the café shortly after her death, and suspects Masayoshi Shido's involvement. Sojiro learns that Joker and his friends are the Phantom Thieves after he discovers the calling card they gave Futaba, and, realizing they saved Futaba's life, lets them use Café Leblanc as their headquarters.

As a Confidant, Sojiro represents the Hierophant Arcana. During his Confidant, he is harassed and extorted by Futaba's abusive uncle. Futaba wants to defend Sojiro, but his coolness towards her causes them to argue. The protagonist helps Sojiro and Futaba reconcile; Sojiro asks Futaba to stay with him, and thanks Joker for reminding him not to take the easy path in life. He is portrayed by Eiji Moriyama in Persona 5: The Stage.

Lavenza

Caroline is the "bad cop", with a short temper and a general dislike of Joker; she guards the entrances to the Velvet Room in Tokyo, and kicks Joker inside when he enters. Justine plays the "good cop" and manages the Persona Compendium, a list of the Personas Joker has owned. Calmer than Caroline, she still treats Joker as a prisoner and guards the Velvet Room entrances in Mementos.

Caroline and Justine represent the Strength Arcana, and encourage Joker to fuse certain personas with skills. When he fails to stop the Holy Grail, they remember that Yaldabaoth had captured Igor and split the pair to prevent them from acting. They fuse into , their true form; she calls Joker "Trickster" instead of "inmate." In Super Smash Bros. Ultimate, Caroline & Justine appear as a spirit.

Igor

 is the prison master of the Velvet Room. As a Confidant he represents the Fool Arcana, allowing Joker to have multiple personas simultaneously. When Joker fails to stop the Holy Grail, Igor declares his rehabilitation a failure and reveals himself as Yaldabaoth in disguise. The real Igor, who has been held captive for the entirety of the story, is freed and helps Joker defeat Yaldabaoth, providing the same services. In Super Smash Bros. Ultimate, Igor appears as a spirit.

Tae Takemi

 owns the Takemi Medical Clinic in Yongen-Jaya. For secretly selling barely-legal prescriptions to her patients, she is nicknamed "the Black Death". The protagonist helps her by participating in clinical trials to test her new medications, which (she hopes) will boost her credibility. Artist Shigenori Soejima said that he originally designed her as "extremely unapproachable, with the eyes of a killer", but softened her appearance at Hashino's request.<ref name="ChallengeDesigned">{{cite web |url=https://kotaku.com/the-challenge-of-designing-two-of-persona-5s-best-chara-1820412666 | title=The challenge of designing two of Persona 5s best characters | publisher=Kotaku | access-date=November 14, 2017 | url-status=live | archive-url=https://web.archive.org/web/20171114202327/https://kotaku.com/the-challenge-of-designing-two-of-persona-5s-best-chara-1820412666 | archive-date=November 14, 2017 | df=mdy-all }}</ref>

As a Confidant, Takemi represents the Death Arcana and gives Joker discounted supplies from her pharmacy. As Joker participates in more of her trials, he learns that Takemi had worked for a university and was fired (and blamed) for a disastrous medical trial she had opposed. She becomes more motivated after treating a young patient with a similar illness; when Joker changes the heart of her former colleague, she saves a former patient's life and regains her reputation.

Munehisa Iwai

 is a former yakuza who owns an airsoft shop, Untouchable, in Shibuya. In the Metaverse, fake guns (and other weapons) work as well as the real thing, so Joker frequently visits Untouchable to supply the Phantom Thieves with equipment. Iwai has an adopted son, Kaoru, whose mother abandoned him when she could not sell him for drug money; unable to bring himself to tell Kaoru about his ties to the yakuza, Iwai instead told him that he was a family friend who took him in after his parents died in a car accident.

Iwai represents the Hanged Man Arcana. In his Confidant, Joker is a lookout for Iwai and helps him with a deal involving his yakuza brother Tsuda (who has been forcing him to illegally customize guns), who is attempting to save face within his organization after a weapons deal he made with the Hong Kong Triads fell through. The deal becomes fraught when Tsuda threatens Joker and Iwai's lives. After the Phantom Thieves change his heart, he repents, admitting that he thought he was losing his place in the organization to younger members. Another yakuza, Masa, tries to take advantage of Tsuda's abandoning the deal; he threatens to kill Kaoru and reveals the truth regarding his parents. Iwai acknowledges Kaoru as his son, and Tsuda takes Masa into custody.

Yuuki Mishima

 is a classmate of Joker and Ann. A member of the volleyball club, he is a frequent target of Kamoshida's abuse. Mishima was forced to not only leak Joker's criminal records on the internet, leading to Joker being ostracized by the student body, but to also summon Shiho Suzui to Kamoshida's office, leading to a sexual assault and Shiho's suicide attempt; Kamoshida nearly expels him for confronting him with Joker and Ryuji. After Kamoshida's arrest, he realizes that Joker, Ryuji, and Ann are the Phantom Thieves. He creates and manages the Phantom Aficionados website, a fan site dedicated to the Thieves with a message board where people post requests for changes of heart. Mishima periodically sends the requests to Joker to enhance the Thieves' reputation.

As a Confidant, Mishima represents the Moon Arcana and will give party members experience points. His fascination with the Phantom Thieves becomes an obsession, and Joker deduces that his motivation to help springs from insecurity and his desire for popularity. When Mishima runs into his bully from middle school, he threatens to have his heart changed. After Joker confronts his Shadow in Mementos, Mishima realizes the error of his ways and saves his bully from thugs.

Sadayo Kawakami

 is Class 2-D's Japanese-language and homeroom teacher (Joker and Ann's class). Kawakami avoids Joker until he learns that she is also a maid to pay the guardians of Taiki Takase, a student from the previous school she worked at. Takase worked several part-time jobs to support his guardians' hedonistic lifestyle, frequently missing school and receiving low grades. When Kawakami began to tutor him, she was ordered by the principal to stop or resign because of Takase's rumored delinquency. Takase was killed in a car accident shortly afterwards, and his guardians use his death to extort money from Kawakami, threatening to sue her if she does not comply.

As a Confidant, Kawakami represents the Temperance Arcana. She helps Joker with chores and gives him free time in class. Initially saying that it pays her sister's medical bills, Kawakami's second job allows her no time to rest and she is hospitalized with exhaustion. When Joker changes the hearts of Takase's guardians, she quits her second job and resolves to be a better teacher.

Toranosuke Yoshida

 is an independent politician and public speaker who has lost seven consecutive elections. He attempts to overcome a bad reputation (where he is nicknamed "No Good Tora") after committing several political blunders early in his career, including accusations of embezzling party funds.

Yoshida represents the Sun Arcana in his Confidant. The player can volunteer to aid his public speaking to build up his Confidant, during which it is learned that the scandal which destroyed his credibility was not his fault; his old mentor misappropriated the funds and made Yoshida a scapegoat. By the end of the Confidant, Yoshida has won a sizable base for his upcoming campaign; the culprit behind the scandal is revealed, allowing him to confront his problems head on. During the general election, despite Shido's party winning a landslide victory, Yoshida's popular support allows him to finally be elected to the Diet.

Ichiko Ohya

 is a reporter and paparazza who represents the Devil Arcana in her Confidant. In her mid-20s, she will write whatever story sells – sometimes manipulating information in her articles for clickbait, even if she does not take the time to research the truth. She was once a more-stringent journalist, but her story exposing the scandal of Masayoshi Shido's cohort was censored and she was reassigned to entertainment. Her partner, Kayo Murakami, disappeared and was framed.

The protagonist leaks information about the Phantom Thieves to the media, allowing Ohya to unearth information about her demotion. Ohya is forced to act as Joker's girlfriend to hide from her bosses that she is working to overcome them. She frequents Shinjuku's Crossroads Bar, where she is friends with drag queen bartender Lala Escargot.

Chihaya Mifune

 is a fortune-teller with a stand in Shinjuku. Although she is part of a con-artist group, her clairvoyance is genuine. Chihaya is from the countryside, and speaks in her original dialect when she is flustered. She moved to Tokyo after being ostracized by her hometown, being accused of witchcraft due to her clairvoyance.

As a Confidant, Chihaya represents the Fortune Arcana and can boost Joker's social statistics and relationships with his other Confidants. She scams Joker out of ¥100,000 to buy a Holy Stone, which turns out to be rock salt. When he confronts her and changes the heart of someone who is bothering one of her clients, she has him accompany her during her readings because she believes that he can change fate. Her employers (the Assembly of Divine Power, a group of New Age con artists) force her to sell fake Holy Stones; she persists, since her readings say that she cannot escape. After Joker changes the Assembly leader's heart so that he will release Chihaya from her contract, he convinces her that the future can be changed, and her destiny is molded by her actions.

Hifumi Togo

 is a champion shogi player from Kosei High School who is often found at the church in Kanda at night. She wishes to become a professional player like her ailing father, who taught her how to play shogi. Her mother encourages her media appearances, and promotes her Japanese idol (to her dismay) when she would rather be praised for her shogi skills. Early in the game's development, Hifumi was conceived as a member of the Phantom Thieves, acting as a more radical strategist in contrast to Makoto's straightforward approach, but she was eventually reduced to a confidant, leaving Makoto with both traits.

As a Confidant, Hifumi represents the Star Arcana and teaches Joker tactical skills (including switching members from the party during battle) with shogi. Hifumi discovers that her mother has been rigging shogi matches in her favor, while also attempting to force Hifumi to quit the game and focus solely on being and idol so she can live her own dream through her daughter. After Joker changes her mother's heart, Hifumi loses a shogi tournament and is called the "Phony Princess" by the media. She is happy to be her real self, however, and vows to continue pursuing her dream to play professionally while rebuilding her reputation as an honest player.

Shinya Oda

 is an elementary-school student who hangs out at the Gigolo Arcade in Akihabara. He is known as the King because of his top score in the shoot 'em up arcade game, Gun About. Shinya idolizes the Phantom Thieves, and Joker asks him for his help in defeating a cheating gamer in Mementos.

As a Confidant, Shinya represents the Tower Arcana and teaches Joker gun moves in Gun About, which Joker utilizes in the Metaverse. Despite his popularity at the arcade, he is swept up in a prank war with his classmates and vows to win (an aggressive trait learned from his mother, Hanae). When his classmates accuse him of bullying, he questions himself and becomes concerned when he realizes that his mother has become more unreasonable, arguing with his school concerning his education. After Hanae sees Shinya hanging out with Joker, she accuses the latter of being a bad influence to her son and threatens to report him to the police. After Joker changes her heart, Shinya makes amends to his classmates.

Takuto Maruki

 is a character introduced in Persona 5 Royal and represents the Councillor Arcana, an Arcana newly introduced for Royal. He is a new guidance counselor that arrives at Shujin Academy after the arrest of Kamoshida. Contrary to Kasumi, his opinion towards the Phantom Thieves is very positive, as he thinks their actions can bring happiness and justice to people. It is eventually revealed he was one of the original researchers of Cognitive Psience, having studied it since his college days, and is hoping to validate his research during his tenure at Shujin. After his fiancé Rumi lost her parents in a violent crime, leaving her in a state of catatonic depression, he awoke to a Persona with the ability to alter the cognitions of others, altering their personalities and memories. Maruki unintentionally used his powers for the first time on Rumi, changing her cognition so that she no longer suffered from the trauma of her parents' deaths, but erasing her memory of him in the process. He would continue using his powers to alter the cognitions of patients that had suffered from similarly severe trauma, such as Sumire Yoshizawa, whose cognition he changed to make her believe she was her deceased sister, Kasumi.

If the protagonist maxed out his confidant with Maruki before the end of his tenure at Shujin, then during the conflict with Yaldabaoth, he will present his finished Cognitive Psience paper to his old professor out of spite, since the funding for his dream of opening a lab in Odaiba was cut off due to a lack of "concrete evidence" (in reality, Shido pulled strings to have the funding shut down and stole Maruki's research, like he did with Futaba's mother). During an argument with his old professor, Maruki becomes vulnerable to the distortion caused by Yaldabaoth's merging of Mementos with the real world, causing his Persona to manifest incompletely and in a berserk state as Azathoth, rather than the being Adam Kadmon; as a result, he enters a delusional state where he believes the only way to improve the world is to use his abilities on everyone to create a utopia, becoming the final antagonist of Royal. Despite possessing a Persona, Maruki manifests a Palace in the Metaverse at the same time, something Morgana notes should be impossible. His Palace represents sorrow and takes the form of a research facility on the site in Odaiba where his lab was to be built before his funding was cut, where people are brainwashed into feeling nothing but happiness before ascending to his perceived utopia. His Treasure appears as a torch in the Metaverse, symbolizing his desire to guide humanity, which manifests in reality as a newspaper clipping detailing the murder of Rumi's parents.

In the new bad/neutral ending, Joker allows Maruki to warp reality to grant all of humanity their desires, and he is last seen taking a group picture of the Phantom Thieves. In the true ending, Maruki is defeated by the Phantom Thieves, making him realises the error of his ways, and that he must face life's hardships head on instead of running away from them. He reforms, becomes a taxi driver, and offers Joker a ride as he is being followed by officers. Maruki tells Joker that he will move forward in his life as well, just like how Joker and his friends will do the same.

Reception
The game's characters were generally well received. According to Simon Miller of trustedreviews.com, "The cast of characters only gets better as the game progresses." The Verge also praised the cast: "Persona 5 has a memorable and lovable cast of characters ... the story is buoyed by a great cast of characters, who – in typical Persona fashion – start out as forgettable teenage archetypes, before revealing themselves to be layered, lovable individuals."GamesRadar+ praised the characters and the new Confidants: "Every aspect of the game's narrative is outstanding, including the many ancillary folks that you can make into 'confidants. Eurogamer enjoyed the characters' exchanges of surreptitious text messages, but objected to the game's gender ethics: "Persona 5 continues the franchise's awkward relationship with queer-coded people". In The Independent, a reviewer called the characters "fantastic".

GameSpew also noted the characters: "Yet as with any Persona game, its biggest selling point is how the game explores such ideas through its colourful cast of characters." According to a Kotaku review, "If you're looking for an RPG with a great story and characters it may be a huge disappointment." However, Amanda Yeo of Kotaku enjoyed the game and its characters: "Persona 5 taught me how to be a friend." A Polygon reviewer liked the game's characters overall, but disliked the portrayal of homosexual characters: "Essentially, some of Persona 5'' only examples of queer characterization are there as a terrible joke."

Explanatory notes

Citations

External links 
 

Lists of fictional Japanese characters
Persona 5

Seven deadly sins in popular culture
Persona 5